The Identity Documents Act 2010 (c. 40) is an Act of Parliament in the United Kingdom which reverses the introduction of identity cards, and requires the destruction of the information held on the National Identity Register.

As a bill, it was presented to the House of Commons by Home Secretary Theresa May on 26 May 2010, making it the first government bill to be introduced to the 55th Parliament of the United Kingdom by the Cameron ministry.

Parliamentary passage
The government initially aimed to have the bill passed into law by August 2010, but the bill did not make sufficient progress to achieve this.

The bill passed the House of Commons on 15 September 2010, and was unopposed by the Opposition. It was introduced to the House of Lords on 5 October 2010, and received its second reading on 18 October 2010, and successfully passed through a Committee of the Whole House without amendment.

At report stage on 17 November 2010, however, peers accepted a Labour amendment to pay compensation to people who had already paid the charge to purchase an ID Card.

The amendment remained in place until the bill returned to the House of Commons, where it was rejected by the Speaker as it imposed an additional charge on the public purse not authorised by the Commons, which holds financial supremacy over the House of Lords. The Lords accepted the Commons disagreement to their amendment, and the bill received Royal Assent on 21 December 2010.

Provisions
The Act repeals the Identity Cards Act 2006 and requires the destruction of the information held on the National Identity Register. It legislates to:
 Cancel all existing ID cards within one month of Royal Assent
 Remove the statutory requirement to issue ID Cards
 Cancel the National Identity Register
 Require the destruction of all data held on the Register within one month of Royal Assent
 Close the Office of the Identity Commissioner
 Re-enact some criminal offences (possession or use of false identity documents) and certain other measures contained in the Identity Cards Act 2006

Although the Act ends the validity of ID cards as travel documents, no action will be taken to withdraw the National Identity Cards already issued.

See also 
 Opinion polls on the British national identity card

References

Further reading

External links
Identity Documents Bill – official page on UK Parliament website

United Kingdom Acts of Parliament 2010
Home Office (United Kingdom)